Chandra Sawad (born 5 February 1991) is a Nepalese cricketer. Sawad is a right-handed batsman and a right-arm medium-fast bowler. He made his debut for Nepal against Hong Kong in March 2012.

He represents the Sagarmatha Legends of the Nepal Premier League, Nepal Army Club of the National League and Pentagon International College, which plays in the SPA Cup.

Playing career 

Sawad was selected in Nepal Under-19s fourteen man squad in the 2008 Under-19 World Cup, though he didn't feature in any of Nepal's Youth One Day International matches in the tournament. He was later selected as part of Nepal's fourteen man squad for the 2012 World Twenty20 Qualifier in the United Arab Emirates, making his Twenty20 debut during the tournament against Hong Kong. He made eight further appearances during the tournament, with his final appearance coming against Papua New Guinea. He took 11 wickets in the tournament, which came at an average of 19.18, with best figures of 4/24. Nepal finished the tournament in seventh place, therefore failing to qualify for the 2012 World Twenty20. In August 2012, he was selected in Nepal's fourteen man squad for the World Cricket League Division Four in Malaysia, but didn't feature in any of Nepal's matches.

References

External links 
 Chandra Sawad on ESPNcricinfo
 Chandra Sawad on CricketArchive
 Chandra Sawad's Facebook Profile

1990s births
Living people
People from Kanchanpur District
Nepalese cricketers